This is a list of notable people from Gaziantep, Turkey.

 Ülkü Tamer - poet and journalist
 Seza Kutlar Aksoy - children's literature writer
 Kemal Aslan - footballer
 Abdullah Atalar - scientist
 Babken I of Cilicia - Armenian Catholicos Coadjutor
 Şahin Bey - war hero; the Şahinbey borough is named after him
 Mustafa Ferit Arsan - one of the leaders of the Turkish militia in the Siege of Aintab
 Murat Ceylan - footballer
 Kenan Doğulu - singer
 Mehmet Görmez - head of the Religious Affairs Directorate
 Ebru Gündeş - musician
 Nedim Gürsel - writer
 Asım Güzelbey - mayor of Gaziantep
 Aram Karamanoukian - Syrian Armenian military general
 Hazal Kaya - actress
 Onat Kutlar - writer, poet
 Kamil Ocak - politician
 Yılmaz Onay - director
 Kadri Pasha - Ottoman Grand Vizier, 1880
 Nurullah Sağlam - footballer
 Luther George Simjian - Armenian American inventor
 Simon Simonian - Armenian author, poet
 Sinan Tuzcu - actor
 Ahmet Ümit - writer, poet
 Necdet Yaşar - musician

References

 
Gaziantep